Kip Noll, also Kip Knoll, is an American gay pornographic film actor-magazine model, active in the 1970s and 1980s.

Noll, who was a lean-muscled, free-spirited surfer type, achieved iconic status in the newly liberated gay culture of the late 1970s and early 1980s. After he was introduced into the gay pornographic film industry, he became closely associated with director William Higgins who first had Noll appearing in a few silent film loops in 1977. Noll was cast as the supposed younger brother of actor Bob Noll, and rapidly became the popular "Noll". After his video success, several other unrelated models were presented as his brothers: Scott, Jeff, and Mark Noll. By the early 1980s Kip Noll had become one of the first superstars in the gay porn industry, as well as being a regular performer at the "D.C. Follies".

Videography
 The Best of Kip Noll (Catalina Video) with Derrick Stanton, Scott Taylor, Jack Burke, Jeremy Scott, Rick, Mark Brennan.
 Boys of Venice (Catalina Video) with Derrick Stanton, Scott Taylor, Eric Ryan, Emanuelle Bravos, Clay Russell, Butch McLester, Guy da Silva, Johnny Stone, Jimmy Young and Darla Lee.
 Brothers Should Do It (Catalina Video) with Jon King, J. W. King, Derrick Stanton, Jack Burke, Giorgio Canali, and Jamie Wingo. Directed by William Higgins.
 Catalina Orgies Vol. 2 (Catalina Video) with Tom Brock, Dean Chasen, Jay Hawkins, Eric Radford, Ricki Benson, Mark Scott Solo, Sergio Canali, Dan Ford, Larry Richards, Tim Richards, Perry Field, Ben Barker, Rob Stevens, Jim Taylor, Rick Brennan, Mike Brennen, Chris Henderson.
 Directors Best: William Higgins Vol. 2 (Catalina Video) with Emmanuelle Bravos, Rob Stevens, Jon King, Lee Marlin, Rick Lindley, Derrick Stanton, Guy DeSilva.
 For You #6 with the five Noll "brothers" in one movie: Bob Noll, Kip Noll, Jeff Noll, Mark Noll, Scott Noll, and Kourey Mitchell and Steve York.
 Kip Noll & the Westside Boys (Catalina Video) with Ben Barker, Rob Stevens, Jim Taylor, Rick Brennan, Mike Brennen, and Chris Henderson. Directed by William Higgins
 Kip Noll Superstar (Catalina Video) with Emanuelle Bravos, Rick & Mike Brennen, Jack Burke, Jeremy Scott, Derrick Stanton and Jon King.
 Try to Take It (Falcon Video Pac 51) with Guillermo, Dick Fisk, Frank, Todd Parker, Bill Eld.
 Wild Young Fuckers (Catalina Video) with John Rocklin, Jeff Quinn, Matt Ramsey, Scott Roberts, Paul Madison, Lance Whitman, Derrick Stanton, Michael Christopher, Mike Dean, Rick Kennedy, Mike Gibson, John Von Crouch, Sparky Ames, Bobby Madison, Giorgio Canali, Todd Johnson, Troy Richards, Steven Richards, Mike Henson, Kevin Williams and John Davenport. Directed by William Higgins.
 Young Men of the 80's Vol. 4 (Catalina Video) with Derrick Stanton.
 Class of 84 Directed by William Higgins.
 Cuming of Age
 Grease Monkeys
 Room Mates
 Pacific Coast Highway

See also
 List of male performers in gay porn films

References

Further reading
 "Interview: Kip Noll." Stallion, June 1982.

External links
 

American actors in gay pornographic films
Place of birth missing (living people)
Year of birth missing (living people)
Possibly living people